Caio Sérgio Caio (born 23 April 1953) is a Brazilian equestrian. He competed in two events at the 1984 Summer Olympics.

References

External links
 

1953 births
Living people
Brazilian male equestrians
Olympic equestrians of Brazil
Equestrians at the 1984 Summer Olympics
Place of birth missing (living people)